Eternamente may refer to:

"Eternamente", art song by Angelo Mascheroni (1855-1905)
Eternamente (album), album by Mexican pop singer, Ana Gabriel 2000
Eternamente, classical album by Angela Gheorghiu 2017
Eternamente, album by the Tejano group Jimmy Gonzalez y Grupo Mazz 2009
Eternamente (pt), album by Cassiane
Eternamente (pt), album by Cristina Mel
Eternamente (pt), album by UHF (Portuguese band)